Teapot Rock, also known as Teapot Dome, is a distinctive sedimentary rock formation in Natrona County, Wyoming, notable for lending its name to a nearby oil field that became notorious as the focus of the Teapot Dome scandal, a bribery scandal during the presidential administration of Warren G. Harding. The site was listed on the National Register of Historic Places in 1974.

Description

Over time, the features that gave the formation its name have been eroded by windstorms; the "handle" disappeared in 1930 and the "spout" in 1962.

History
In 1915, the Teapot Dome Oil Field was designated Naval Petroleum Reserve Number Three as part of a program to ensure that the U.S. Navy, which was converting to oil-fired boilers at the time, would have sufficient fuel reserves in an emergency. It was one of several related fields in the area, the largest of which was the Salt Creek Oil Field.

In February 2015, the field was sold by the Department of Energy.

References

External links

Historic American Engineering Record documentation, filed under Midwest, Natrona County, WY:

Historic American Engineering Record in Wyoming
Landforms of Natrona County, Wyoming
Rock formations of Wyoming
Teapot Dome scandal
Natural features on the National Register of Historic Places in Wyoming
National Register of Historic Places in Natrona County, Wyoming
Naval Petroleum Reserve